Nick Drake (1948–1974) was an English folk musician who recorded 66 songs during his short career. Of those 66, only 31 were officially released during his lifetime. Drake's music went largely unnoticed during his lifetime, largely due to his reluctance to perform live or give interviews; it wasn't until decades after his death that his music grew in stature and has achieved widespread recognition.

Drake released three albums during his lifetime: Five Leaves Left (1969), Bryter Layter (1971), and Pink Moon (1972). Five Leaves Left and Bryter Layter were both produced by Joe Boyd and each featured backing musicians. Pink Moon, on the other hand, was produced by John Wood and featured no backing musicians, just Drake solely.

List

Notes

References

Drake, Nick